Colemaniella may refer to:
 Colemaniella (worm), a genus of worms in the family Lineidae
 Colemaniella (fungus), a genus of fungi in the division Ascomycota, order and family unassigned